"Can't Erase It" is a song written and performed by Jars of Clay. The song was the sixth and final radio single in promotion of the band's third studio album, If I Left the Zoo. The Tweed Horse Sessions demo of the song was released on the album The White Elephant Sessions, while a live version of the song can be found on the various artists compilation album, Celebrate Freedom Live (2000, Essential). The song reached number nine on the Christian rock chart.

Track listing
"Can't Erase It" – 3:33 (Dan Haseltine, Matt Odmark, Stephen Mason, & Charlie Lowell)

2000 singles
Jars of Clay songs
Songs written by Dan Haseltine
Songs written by Charlie Lowell
Songs written by Stephen Mason (musician)
Songs written by Matt Odmark
1999 songs
Essential Records (Christian) singles